Juma Othman Ali (born 10 March 1950) is a Tanzanian CCM politician and Member of Parliament for Tumbatu constituency since 2010.

References

1950 births
Living people
Chama Cha Mapinduzi MPs
Tanzanian MPs 2010–2015